Ömer Şükrü Asan (born May 28, 1961) is a Turkish folklorist, photographer and writer.

In 2002, he was charged with allegations that he violated Article 8 of Turkey's Anti-Terror Law by "propagandating separatism" for his book Pontos Kültürü. In 2003, Article 8 was abolished, and Asan was acquitted as a result.

His articles, stories and research studies have been published in Radikal, Sabah and Milliyet newspapers, Gezi, Yaşasın Edebiyat, Adam Öykü and Kafkasya Yazıları, Sky Life.

Asan was born in Trabzon, Turkey.

Publications 
Pontos Kültürü (1996), in Turkish, 
Hasan İzzettin Dinamo (2000), biography
Niko'nun kemençesi (2005), short stories

Awards 
 Abdi İpekçi, Peace and Friendship Award presented by Turkish-Greek Friendship Association for his article published in Milliyet newspaper.

See also 
Pontic language
Trabzon
Pontian Greeks
Greek Muslims

References

External links 
 Trabzon Greek: A language without a tongue
Folk songs of Pontos in Turkish
Writers in Prison Committee

1961 births
People from Trabzon
Living people
Turkish culture
Turkish writers
Turkish photographers
Folklorists